Kerby Creek is a stream in the U.S. state of Oregon. It is a tributary to Bessie Creek.

Kerby Creek was named in honor of Ed Kerby, a US Forest Service ranger.

References

Rivers of Oregon
Rivers of Jackson County, Oregon